The 5th World Table Tennis Championships were held in Budapest from February 10 to February 15, 1931.

Medalists

Team

Individual

References

External links
ITTF Museum

 
World Table Tennis Championships
World Table Tennis Championships
World Table Tennis Championships
Table tennis competitions in Hungary
International sports competitions in Budapest
February 1931 sports events
1930s in Budapest